Chūō, Tokyo held a mayoral election on April 15, 2007 as part of the 2007 unified elections. Incumbent mayor Yada Yoshihide, was re-elected.

Candidates 
 Yada Yoshihide, long-time mayor of Chūō backed by the Liberal Democratic Party and Komeito.
 Satou Tatsuo, representative for the Tsukiji fish market and backed by the Japanese Communist Party.

Results

References 
 Results from webpage JanJan 

Chūō, Tokyo
2007 elections in Japan
Mayoral elections in Japan
April 2007 events in Japan
2007 in Tokyo